Aleesha Young (born November 10, 1984) is an American bodybuilder who won the NPC USA Championships in 2014.

Young comes from an athletic family. Her father is a retired bodybuilding competitor, her brother plays American football and ice hockey, and her sister plays ice hockey. Young herself first trained in softball, cheerleading, basketball and soccer, and only at the age of 15 did she begin bodybuilding, alongside her father.

Contest history 

2008 NPC National Bodybuilding & Figure Championships – 15th
2009 NPC USA Bodybuilding & Figure Championships – 7th
2011 NPC USA Championships – 8th
2014 NPC USA Championships – 1st
2014 IFBB Wings of Strength PBW Tampa Pro – 9th
2015 IFBB Wings of Strength PBW Tampa Pro – 9th
2015 IFBB WOS Rising Phoenix World Championships – 6th
 2017 IFBB WOS Rising Phoenix World Championships – 6th and Most Muscular award
 2019 Chicago Pro Championships - 1st
 2019 IFBB WOS Rising 
Phoenix World Championships - 10th
 2020 IFBB WOS Rising Phoenix World Championships  - 4th

Personal life 
Young lives near her hometown of Salt Lake City. She is divorced and has a daughter named Olivia.

References 

1984 births
American female bodybuilders
Living people
Professional bodybuilders
21st-century American women